Donal O'Sullivan (1893–1973) was an Irish politician. He was an independent member of Seanad Éireann from 1943 to 1944. He was elected to the 4th Seanad in 1943 by the Cultural and Educational Panel. He lost his seat at the 1944 Seanad election. He was also a Clerk of the Seanad.

References

1893 births
1973 deaths
Members of the 4th Seanad
Independent members of Seanad Éireann